The Bleeker's catfish (Nemapteryx bleekeri) is a species of catfish in the family Ariidae. It was described by Canna Maria Louise Popta in 1900, originally under the genus Arius. It inhabits estuaries and marine coasts near Indonesia.

References

Ariidae
Fish described in 1900
Taxa named by Canna Maria Louise Popta